Ding Xingnong (born February 1963) is a lieutenant general in the People's Liberation Army of China.

He was a member of the 19th Central Commission for Discipline Inspection. He is a representative of the 20th National Congress of the Chinese Communist Party and an alternate member of the 20th Central Committee of the Chinese Communist Party.

Biography
Ding was born in Jianhu County, Jiangsu, in February 1963. 

In March 2012, he rose to become director of the Political Department of the People's Liberation Army General Armaments Department.

In December 2021, he was chosen as director of the Political Work Department of the People's Liberation Army Strategic Support Force.

He was promoted to the rank of major general (shaojiang) in July 2010 and lieutenant general (zhongjiang) in 2019.

References

1963 births
Living people
People from Jianhu County
People's Liberation Army generals from Jiangsu
People's Republic of China politicians from Jiangsu
Chinese Communist Party politicians from Jiangsu
Alternate members of the 20th Central Committee of the Chinese Communist Party